The Northrop Beta was an American single-engine, all-metal, low-wing sporting monoplane built in 1931.

Design and development
The Beta was a two-seater with a 160 hp (119 kW) Menasco Buccaneer inline engine.  The first aircraft registered as NX963Y (later NC963Y) crashed in California. The second aircraft, N12214, was built as a single-seater and fitted with a 300 hp (224 kW) Pratt & Whitney Wasp Jr. radial engine, and became the first aircraft of such power to exceed 200 mph (322 km/h). Only two were built.

The aircraft was flown to Wichita for sister company Stearman Aircraft to use as a demonstrator but with the poor economy at the time, none were sold. The aircraft was sold to a wealthy pilot in New York and during its delivery, it passed through Wright Field in order to allow a thorough examination by Army Air Corps Engineers as the Air Corps was still using obsolete biplanes.

After being rarely flown during 1932, the aircraft was sold to a new owner who kept it at Roosevelt Field until it was flipped over at a nearby airport. The aircraft was repaired at the Stearman factory in Wichita and used as an experimental test platform for various flap designs until it crashed due to a wing structural failure on May 4, 1934.

Specifications (Beta 3D)

See also

References

Beta
1930s United States sport aircraft
Low-wing aircraft
Single-engined tractor aircraft
Aircraft first flown in 1931